St Brendan's Chapel, also known as Kilbrannan Chapel, and Skipness Chapel, is a medieval chapel near Skipness, Argyll and Bute, Scotland. The chapel appears to have been built in the late 13th or early 14th century and was dedicated to St. Brendan. The chapel replaced an earlier chapel dedicated to St. Columba at nearby Skipness Castle. There is reason to suspect that the introduction of St Brendan's cult at Skipness was carried out by the Stewarts, after their acquisition of the Clann Suibhne lordship in the mid thirteenth century. By the fourteenth century, St Brendan was closely associated with the Stewarts and their island of Bute.

Coupled with nearby Skipness Castle it is designated a scheduled ancient monument.

Notes

13th-century establishments in Scotland
14th-century establishments in Scotland
Churches in Argyll and Bute
Church ruins in Scotland
Historic Scotland properties in Argyll and Bute
Ruins in Argyll and Bute
Scheduled Ancient Monuments in Argyll and Bute